The final round of the EuroBasket Women 2019 took place between 2 and 7 July 2019.

Qualified teams
The group winners qualified for the quarterfinals while the second- and third placed teams advanced to the qualification round.

Bracket
Class. games to OQTs

Times for games in Riga are UTC+3 and in Belgrade UTC+2.

Qualification for quarterfinals

Quarterfinals

Class. games to OQTs

Semifinals

Third place game

Final

References

External links
Official website

Final round